Ovaeymir is a town in the central district (Aydın) of  Aydın Province, Turkey. At  It is almost merged to Aydın, the province center, where the motorway  draws the border line between Aydın and Ovaeymir municipalities.  The population of Ovaeymir was 7135 as of 2012. The original location of Ovaeymir was by the Büyükmenderes river side. But the present Ovaeymir was founded after the original settlement was hit by a flood disaster about two centuries ago. In 1994, the settlement was declared a seat of township. The main economic sector of the town of Ovaeymir is agriculture and some residents work as construction workers in Aydın.

References

Populated places in Aydın Province
Towns in Turkey
Efeler District